The treasure of Loch Arkaig, sometimes known as the Jacobite gold, was a large amount of specie provided by Spain to finance the Jacobite rising in Scotland in 1745, and rumoured still to be hidden at Loch Arkaig in Lochaber.

Background
In 1745, Prince Charles Edward Stuart (Bonnie Prince Charlie) arrived in Scotland from France and claimed the thrones of Scotland, England and Ireland, in the name of his father James Stuart (the Old Pretender).  Although Charles asserted that his venture was supported by Louis XV of France, and that the arrival of French forces in Scotland was imminent, in truth France had little intention to intervene on the Stuarts' behalf. However, some limited financial support was supplied by both Spain and the Pope.

Spain pledged some 400,000 livres (or Louis d'Or) per month for the Jacobite cause. However, getting this money to the rebel army was the difficulty. The first instalment (sent via Charles' brother Henry who was resident in France) was dispatched in 1745. The French sloop Hazard (renamed the Prince Charles) successfully landed its monies on the west coast of Scotland. Unfortunately for the Jacobites, the riches were soon captured by Clan Mackay, who were loyal to King George II, in the Skirmish of Tongue.

Treasure arrives

In April 1746, the ships Mars and Bellona arrived in Scotland with 1,200,000 livres (another Spanish instalment, plus a large French supplement). However, on learning of the Jacobite defeat at the Battle of Culloden on 16 April, the ships left, unloading only the Spanish money at Loch nan Uamh, Arisaig on 30 April (the same place from where the prince had disembarked the year before, and would later embark for France). Thus, seven caskets of Spanish gold arrived in Scotland. As the Jacobite cause was by then lost, with the army scattered and the prince and his lieutenants in hiding, the money was to be used to assist the Jacobite clansmen (then being subjected to the brutalities of the government forces of the Duke of Cumberland) and to facilitate the escape of leading Jacobites to the continent.

Six caskets (one having been stolen by McDonald of Barrisdale's men) were brought to Loch Arkaig (just north of Fort William) and hidden. Their secret was entrusted to Murray of Broughton, one of the Jacobite fugitives. Murray began the distribution to clan chiefs, but when he was apprehended by the government (and later turned state's evidence) the treasure was entrusted first to Lochiel, the chief of Clan Cameron, and then to Ewen MacPherson of Cluny, head of Clan Macpherson. Cluny was hiding in a cave at Ben Alder, which came to be known as "the cage", and when Charles briefly joined him there, Cluny had control of the  money, which was still hidden at Arkaig.

Treasure hunt

Charles finally escaped Scotland in the French frigate L'Heureux and arrived back in France in September 1746. However, the fate of the money is not as clear. Cluny is believed to have retained control of it, and during his long years as a fugitive was at the centre of various futile plots to finance another uprising. Indeed, he remained in hiding in his Highland "cage" for the next eight years. Meanwhile, a cash-strapped Charles was constantly looking for his money and at least some of it came to him later, paying for the minting of a campaign medal in the 1750s. However, it is said that all of the gold was never recovered. Charles, years later, accused Cluny of embezzlement. Whatever the case, the gold became a source of discord and grievance among the surviving Jacobites.

In 1753, Archibald Cameron—Lochiel's brother, who was acting as secretary to the Old Pretender—was sent back to Scotland to locate the treasure. However, whilst staying secretly at Brenachyle by Loch Katrine, he was betrayed (apparently by the notorious "Pickle", a Hanoverian spy) and arrested. He was charged under the Act of Attainder for his part in the 1745 uprising and sentenced to death, being drawn and then hanged on 7 June 1753, at Tyburn (the last Jacobite to be executed).

The trail then goes cold. However, the Stuarts' papers (now in the possession of Queen Elizabeth II) record a host of claims, counter-claims and accusations among the Highland chiefs and Jacobites in exile, as to the fate of the monies. The historian Andrew Lang (who was one of the first people to research the papers since Walter Scott secured them for the crown) recorded, in his book Pickle the Spy (1897), the sordid tale, and the involvement of both the prince and his father in trying to locate the monies. The Stuart papers also include an account from around 1750, drawn up in Rome by Archibald Cameron, which indicates that Cluny had not or could not account for all of it.

According to Clan Cameron records, some French gold coins were found buried in nearby woods in the 1850s.

The Staff of Gaor Bheinn
In the 2015 Ed Perkins documentary, The lost gold of the Highlands (retitled Garnet's Gold), Garnet Frost explains how he had found a wooden staff wedged in a rock in a 'rivulet' at the foot of Gulvain (south of Loch Arkaig). He suspected the treasure had been hidden in the vicinity, although returning to the location, approximately 56°58'10.0"N 5°15'39.3"W, he didn't find anything.

In fiction
The "Arkaig treasure" is featured in Nigel Tranter's historical fiction novel Gold for Prince Charlie.
The missing treasure features in Neil Munro's novel Children of the Tempest, a love story set in the Outer Hebrides in the late 18th century. Published originally in 1903, rev.ed 2002.
The treasure also features in Diana Gabaldon's Outlander series of historical fiction novels, and in particular is a main plot point in The Fiery Cross, the fifth book of the series.
The treasure is featured in the Sherlock Holmes pastiche The Adventure of the Dishonourable Discharge by Craig Janacek. It is published in The MX Book of New Sherlock Holmes Stories, Part XII: Some Untold Cases (1894-1902).

Notes

References

Cameron, Archibald's "Memorial Concerning the Locharkaig Treasure" (Stuart Papers, the Royal Collection, Vol. 300, Nº 80).
Kybert, Susan Maclean "Bonnie Prince Charlie: A biography" Unwin 1988  pp. 191, 215–16, 224, 245, 257, 267.

Treasure of Loch Arkaig
Treasure of Loch Arkaig
Treasure of Loch Arkaig
Treasure of Loch Arkaig
Treasure of Loch Arkaig